Rajya Sabha elections were held on various dates in 1967, to elect members of the Rajya Sabha, Indian Parliament's upper chamber.

Elections
Elections were held to elect members from various states.

Members elected
The following members are elected in the elections held in 1967. They are members for the term 1967-1973 and retire in year 1973, except in case of the resignation or death before the term.
The list is incomplete.

State - Member - Party

Bye-elections
The following bye elections were held in the year 1967.

State - Member - Party

 Andhra - Yasoda Reddy - INC ( ele  23/03/1967 term till 1972 )
 Madras - V V Ramaswamy -OTH ( ele  20/03/1967 term till 1968 )
 Andhra - M Chenna Reddy - INC ( ele  27/03/1967 term till 1968 )
 Madhya Pradesh - Shiv Dutt Upadhyaya - INC ( ele  31/03/1967 term till 1970 )
 Haryana - Mukhtiar Singh Malik - INC ( ele  06/04/1967 term till 1968 )
 Punjab -  Bhupinder Singh Brar - INC ( ele  06/04/1967 term till 1970 )
 Bihar - Rewati Kant Sinha - INC ( ele  06/04/1967 term till 1970 )
 Kerala - Aravindakshan Kaimal - OTH ( ele  17/04/1967 term till 1968 )
 Kerala - K Chandrasekaran - SP ( ele  17/04/1967 term till 1970 )
 Maharashtra - Vimal Punjab Deshmukh - INC ( ele  19/04/1967 term till 1972 )
 Maharashtra - A. G. Kulkarni - INC ( ele  19/04/1967 term till 1970 )
 Orissa - Bira Kesari Deo - INC ( ele  19/04/1967 term till 1970 )
 Uttar Pradesh - Triloki Singh - INC ( ele  27/04/1967 term till 1968 )
 Uttar Pradesh - Srikrishna Dutt Paliwal - INC ( ele  27/04/1967 term till 1968 )
 Tripura - Dr Triguna Sen - INC ( ele  27/04/1967 term till 1968 )
 Mysore - T Siddalingaya - INC ( ele  03/05/1967 term till 1968 )
 Rajashtan - Ram Niwas Mirdha - INC ( ele  04/05/1967 term till 1968 )
 Rajashtan - Harish Chandra Mathur - IND ( ele  04/05/1967 term till 1968 )
 Jammu and Kashmir - Tirath Ram Amla - INC ( ele  04/05/1967 term till 1970 )
 Jammu and Kashmir - A M Tariq - INC ( ele  04/05/1967 term till 1968 )
 Assam - Sriman Prafulla Goswami - INC ( ele  04/05/1967 term till 1972 )
 Assam - Emonsing M Sangma - INC ( ele  04/05/1967 term till 1972 )
 Uttar Pradesh - Bindumati Devi - C-O ( ele  09/07/1967 term till 1972 )
 Gujarat - Tribhovandas K Patel - INC ( ele  21/07/1967 term till 1968 )
 Orissa - Brahmananda Panda - OTH ( ele  30/11/1967 term till 1972 )

References

1967 elections in India
1967